Arcangela Felice Assunta Wertmüller von Elgg Spanol von Braueich (14 August 1928 – 9 December 2021), known as Lina Wertmüller, was an Italian film director and screenwriter. She is best known for her 1970s art house films Seven Beauties (a genre-bending World War II film for which she became the first female director to be nominated for the Academy Award for Best Director in 1977), The Seduction of Mimi, Love and Anarchy, and Swept Away. In 2019, Wertmüller was announced as one of four recipients of the Academy Honorary Award for her career, the second female director to be so honoured.

Early life
Wertmüller was born Arcangela Felice Assunta Wertmüller von Elgg Spanol von Braueich in Rome in 1928 to Federico, a lawyer from Palazzo San Gervasio, Basilicata, belonging to a devoutly Catholic family of distant Swiss descent, and to Maria Santamaria-Maurizio born in Rome. Wertmüller depicted her childhood as a period of adventure, during which she was expelled from 15 different Catholic high schools. During this time, she was infatuated with comic books and described them as especially influential on her in her youth, particularly Alex Raymond's Flash Gordon. Wertmüller characterized the framing of Raymond's comics as "rather cinematic, more cinematic than most films", an early indication of her inclination toward film. Wertmüller's desire to work in the film and theater industries took hold at a young age, as early on in life she developed an appreciation for the works of the Russian playwrights Pietro Sharoff, Vladimir Nemirovich-Danchenko, and Konstantin Stanislavsky, drawing her into the world of performing arts. 

After graduating from Accademia Nazionale di Arte Drammatica Silvio D'Amico in 1951, Wertmüller produced avant-garde plays, traveling throughout Europe and working as a puppeteer, stage manager, set designer, publicist, and radio/TV scriptwriter. She joined Maria Signorelli's troupe in 1951.

These interests developed toward two generic avenues; one being the musical comedy and the other being grave, contemporary Italian dramas like the works of Italian playwright and director Giorgio De Lullo, whose work she described as "serious" and "politically conscious". It is these two approaches that Wertmüller stated were at the core of her creative self, and always would be.

Film career

1960s 
After her years spent touring with an avant-garde puppet group, Wertmüller set her sights on film. In the early 1960s, Flora Carabella, a school friend, introduced Wertmüller to her husband, the actor Marcello Mastroianni, who in turn introduced her to the film director Federico Fellini, who became her mentor. 

Although The Basilisks, which was scored by Ennio Morricone, was critically well received, it did not garner the sort of attention her later works did.

Throughout the 1960s, Wertmüller produced a series of films that were well liked but that failed to garner international success. Of these, her first collaboration with Giancarlo Giannini occurred in 1966's musical comedy Rita the Mosquito. Darragh O'Donoghue wrote in Cineaste that generally "her early films comprise a fairly straight pastiche of neorealism and early Fellini (The Lizards, 1963), an episodic comedy, two musicals, and a Spaghetti Western (The Belle Starr Story, 1968, directed under the pseudonym Nathan Wich), works where knowledge of generic predecessors was essential".

1970s 
The 1970s saw the release of virtually all of Wertmüller's most influential and highly regarded films, many of which featured Giannini. According to Geoffrey Nowell-Smith's Companion to Italian Cinema, 1972 "marked the beginning of Wertmüller's golden age". Beginning in 1972 with The Seduction of Mimi, and continuing until 1978 with Blood Feud, Wertmüller released seven films, many of which are considered masterpieces of Commedia all'italiana. It was during this time she saw critical and international success, gaining traction as a filmmaker outside of Italy and in the United States on a scale that many of her contemporaries were baffled by and unable to attain. In 1975, the National Board of Review in the United States awarded Swept Away Top Foreign Film, and in 1976, she became the first female director to be nominated for an Oscar, for Seven Beauties. This film, which again features Giannini in the lead role, pushes Wertmüller's specific brand of tragic comedy to its limits, following a self-obsessed Casanova from a small Italian town who is sent to a German concentration camp. The film initially met with controversy due to Wertmüller's frankness in her rendering of the apparatuses of genocide as well as her perceived macabre insensitivity toward its survivors, but since has been accepted as her masterwork.

Wertmüller then signed a contract with Warner Bros. to make four films. The first was her first English-language film, A Night Full of Rain, which was entered into the 28th Berlin International Film Festival in 1978. The film was not a success and Warner canceled the contract.

1980s 
Wertmüller's 1983 film A Joke of Destiny was entered into the 14th Moscow International Film Festival in 1985 and Camorra (A Story of Streets, Women and Crime) was entered into the 36th Berlin International Film Festival in 1986.

In 1985, she received the Women in Film Crystal Award for outstanding women who, through endurance and the excellence of their work, have helped to expand the role of women within the entertainment industry.

After this period of acclaim, Wertmüller began to fade from international prominence, though she continued to release films well into the 1980s and '90s. Some of these films were sponsored by American financiers and studios, but failed to have the breadth of reach that her 1970s output achieved. These films are less widely seen and were neglected or disparaged by most, but Summer Night (1986), Ferdinando & Carolina (1999), and Ciao, Professore have since improved in reputation.

Wertmüller is known for her whimsically prolix movie titles. For instance, the full title of Swept Away is Swept away by an unusual destiny in the blue sea of August. These titles were invariably shortened for international release. She is entered in the Guinness Book of Records for the longest film title, Un fatto di sangue nel comune di Siculiana fra due uomini per causa di una vedova. Si sospettano moventi politici. Amore-Morte-Shimmy. Lugano belle. Tarantelle. Tarallucci e vino, which totals 179 characters. The film is better known under the international titles Blood Feud or Revenge.

Later life 

Wertmüller was married to Enrico Job (died 4 March 2008), an art designer who worked on several of her pictures.

In 2015, Wertmüller was the subject of a biographical film directed by Valerio Ruiz, Behind the White Glasses, in which she reflects on her life's work.

Wertmüller continued to work as a theater director until her death at her home on 9 December 2021, at the age of 93.

Style and themes
Fellini's influence is evident in much of Wertmüller's work. They share empathy with the Italian working class, showing the realities of life for the politically neglected and economically downtrodden, with a tendency toward the preposterous. Wertmüller's work also seems to exhibit adoration of Italy and its varied locales, beautifying elements of her film's locations with cinematography that presents its subjects with a colorful extravagance that idealizes the distinctly Italian settings of her films. Her aesthetic borrows heavily from her background in theater, routinely using the camera to emphasize performance and the grandiose comedy of her characters’ near constant emotional frenzy. Much of her work uses formal film tactics to dramatize the misapplication and destructive qualities that political ideology can have on individuals, satirizing common conceptions of revolution and the political status quo in the process.

Narrative and cinematic reflexivity are also commonplace in Wertmüller's films, as she rehashed and reconfigured signs and modes of presentation in a way that references her inspirations and her contemporaries. This is made clear through her disruption of traditional conceptions of virtually all political dogma and the irrationality of her characters, taking recognizable elements of society and film and critiquing them by doing away with narrative and/or character plausibility.

This is particularly evident in a film like The Seduction of Mimi. This positions Mimi (played by Giannini) as an impossibly inept and simple man who fully embodies the notion of Italian machismo, as he fumbles his way through a world that throws a variety of ideologies and economic positions at him, all of which he readily inhabits. Mimi is perpetually successful in his performance of these roles, despite the audience's awareness of their inauthenticity that results from a diegetic acknowledgement of Mimi's hapless ignorance. This element of critique in the film functions as one example of one of the most prevalent themes in Wertmüller's work, a desire to deconstruct and subvert the institutions and social ideologies of a capitalist modernity. This socialist-inflected politicization of class and the institution are also extended to sexuality and gender. Most of her films deploy these elements in conjunction with her affection for the theatrical in such a way that creates a unique concoction that is undeniably within the generic confines of Commedia all’italiana.

According to Peter Bondanella, "Wertmüller's work combined a concern with topical political issues and the conventions of traditional Italian grotesque comedy".

Awards and nominations
1963, Locarno International Film Festival. Winner of Silver Sail for Direction for The Basilisk
1964, Golden Goblets Italy. Winner of Plate for The Basilisk
1972, Cannes Film Festival. Nominated for Palme d'Or for The Seduction of Mimi
1973, Cannes Film Festival. Nominated For Palme d'Or for Love and Anarchy
1975, National Board of Review. Winner of Top Foreign Film for Swept Away
1975, Tehran International Film Festival, Winner of Golden Ibex for Swept Away
1977, Academy Awards. Nominated for Best Director for Seven Beauties 
1977, Academy Awards. Nominated for Best Original Screenplay for Seven Beauties 
1977, Directors Guild of America Awards. Nominated for Outstanding Directorial Achievement in Motion Pictures for Seven Beauties
1985, Women in Film Crystal Awards. Winner for achievement. 
1986, Berlin International Film Festival, Otto Dibelius Film Award for Camorra (A Story of Streets, Women and Crime).
2008, Flaiano International Prizes. Winner of career award. 
2009, Golden Globes Italy. Winner of Golden Globe for career achievement.
2010, David di Donatello Awards. Winner for career achievement.
2017, Boston Society of Film Critics Awards. Best Rediscoveries for Seven Beauties.
2019, Academy Awards. Honorary Academy Award Recipient.
2019, Hollywood walk of fame star

Filmography

References

Sources
 
 Bullaro, Grace Russo. Man in Disorder - The Cinema of Lina Wertmüller in the 1970s 
 Déléas, Josette. Lina Wertmüller - Un rire noir chaussé de lunettes blanches - a critical biography filled with anecdotes and Lina's humor 
 William R. Magretta and Joan Magretta. "Lina Wertmuller and the Tradition of Italian Carnivalesque Comedy" in Genre 12, pp. 25–43. (1979)
 Tiziana Masucci. I chiari di Lina (Edizioni Sabinae, Roma 2009)
 
 
 Behind The White Glasses, Dir. Valerio Ruiz, Italy, 2015.

External links

 

1928 births
2021 deaths
Academy Honorary Award recipients
Accademia Nazionale di Arte Drammatica Silvio D'Amico alumni
David di Donatello Career Award winners
Film directors from Rome
Italian Roman Catholics
Italian people of Swiss descent
Italian screenwriters
Italian socialists
Italian women film directors
Italian women screenwriters